Ivo Manuel Correia Casas (born 21 September 1992) is a Portuguese volleyball player who plays for  S.L. Benfica and the Portugal men's national team.

Honours
Benfica
Portuguese First Division: 2014–15, 2016–17, 2018–19
Portuguese Cup: 2014–15, 2015–16, 2017–18, 2018–19
 Portuguese Super Cup: 2014, 2015, 2016, 2018, 2019

References

External links
 Benfica official profile 
 Profile at FIVB.org

1992 births
Living people
Portuguese men's volleyball players
Place of birth missing (living people)
S.L. Benfica volleyball players